The S10 district lies within in the City of Sheffield, South Yorkshire, England.  The district contains 185 listed buildings that are recorded in the National Heritage List for England.  Of these, 12 are listed at Grade II*, the middle grade, and the others are at Grade II, the lowest grade.  The district is in the south west of the city of Sheffield, and covers the areas Broomhill, Crookes, Crookesmoor, Crosspool, Fulwood, Lodge Moor, Nether Green and Ranmoor, and part of Broomhall.

For neighbouring areas, see listed buildings in Sheffield City Centre, listed buildings in S3, listed buildings in S6, listed buildings in S11, and listed buildings in Hathersage.



Key

Buildings

References 

 - A list of all the listed buildings within Sheffield City Council's boundary is available to download from this page.

Sources

 S10
Sheffield S10